Fritz Peus ( 22 April 1904, Siegen- 17 November 1978, Berlin ) full name Friedrich Ferdinand Christian Peus  was a German entomologist who specialised in Coleoptera, Diptera and Siphonaptera.

From 1923 to 1927 Peus studied zoology, botany and physics at the University of Münster. During the second world war, Peus was engaged  as an Army entomologist and employed in malaria research. He had joined the NSDAP party in 1940. Peus was later Director of the Museum für Naturkunde Berlin and Professor for special zoology at the Humboldt University of Berlin and from 1962 up to his retirement in 1969 Professor of applied zoology at the Freie Universität Berlin.

Works
partial list
Erich Martini, Fritz Peus,Werner Reichmuth (1952) Lehrbuch der medizinischen Entomologie Jena : G. Fischer
Peus F. (1958) 10a. Tanyderidae 10b. Liriopeidae.Lindner E. (Ed.) Die Fliegen der paläarktischen Region, 3, Lieferung 200: 1–44.
Peus F. (1960) Zur Kenntnis der ornithoparasitischen Phormiinen (Diptera, Calliphoridae) Deutsche Entomologische Zeitschrift Volume 7, Issue 3, pages 193–235, 1960 DOI: 10.1002/mmnd.19600070302
Peus F. (2003) Stechmücken. (= Die Neue Brehm – Bücherei. Band 22). Hohenwarsleben 2003, . (Nachdruck der Auflage von 1951 bei Westarp-Wissenschaften-Verlagsgesellschaft)

References
Merz, B. F.; Hollier, J.; Schwendinger, P. 2011: The entomology collections of the Geneva Natural History Museum Antenna Bulletin of the Royal Entomological Society of London, London 35 (498): 163-168
Steffan, A. W. 1976 [Peus, F.] Entomologica Germanica. Zeitschrift für das Gesamtgebiet der wissenschaftlichen Entomologie, Stuttgart 2, S. 388-393, B15 11838
Zobodat

German entomologists
1978 deaths
1904 births
20th-century German zoologists